Gean Pamela O'Neil (1951-2018) was an international lawn and indoor bowler representing Jersey.

Bowls career
Gean was part of the fours team with Christine Grimes, Suzie Dingle and Karina Bisson that won the silver medal at the 2004 World Outdoor Bowls Championship in Leamington Spa.

In 2005 she won the singles and triples bronze medals at the Atlantic Bowls Championships.

O'Neil is a three times British champion after winning the 2004 pairs and the fours titles in 2009 and 2013, at the British Isles Bowls Championships.

References 

1951 births
2018 deaths
Jersey female bowls players